Transport Fever is a business video game series developed by Urban Games and published by Gambitious Digital Entertainment. The franchise was introduced in 2014, when the first game titled as Train Fever, with the latest game titled as Transport Fever 2 was released in 2019.

Games

Train Fever (2014)

The first video game of the series was initially released on 4 September 2014 for Microsoft Windows, macOS, Linux.

Transport Fever (2016)

A sequel, titled Transport Fever was announced in April 2016. It was available worldwide for Microsoft Windows on 8 November 2016.

Transport Fever 2 (2019)

Transport Fever 2 was initially available for Microsoft Windows and Linux via Steam on 11 December 2019. Urban Games remained to develop the game, with Good Shepherd Entertainment, which rebranded from Gambitious Digital Entertainment published the game. A macOS version released in autumn 2020.

References

External links
 
 
 

Business simulation games
Linux games
Indie video games
 
Transport simulation games
Video game franchises introduced in 2014